Anterior median fissure may refer to:

 Anterior median fissure of the spinal cord
 Anterior median fissure of the medulla oblongata